The Mavericks is the sixth studio album by the American country music band The Mavericks. It was their only release for Sanctuary Records, and their first studio album since Trampoline in 1998. The album produced three singles in "I Want to Know", "Would You Believe" and a cover version of "The Air That I Breathe", which was made famous by The Hollies. The latter was the only single to enter the charts, peaking at number 59 on Billboard Hot Country Singles & Tracks (now Hot Country Songs). The Mavericks was the band's final studio album before they disbanded in 2003.

Also included on this album is a duet with Willie Nelson, "Time Goes By", and "In My Dreams" co-written and previously recorded by Rick Trevino on his 2003 album In My Dreams, an album which The Mavericks' lead singer Raul Malo produced. Trevino's version was also a single in 2003, peaking at #41 on the country charts.

Track listing
"I Want to Know" (Raul Malo) – 3:31
"In My Dreams" (Malo, Alan Miller, Rick Trevino) – 4:42
"Shine Your Light" (Malo) – 3:45
"I'm Wondering" (Malo, Dale Watson) – 3:15
"By the Time" (Malo, Alan Miller, Jaime Hanna) – 4:35
"Would You Believe" (Malo, Alan Miller) – 5:24
"Too Lonely" (Malo, Alan Miller) – 3:06
"Time Goes By" (Malo, Alan Miller, Hanna) – 4:37
"San Jose" (Malo, Alan Miller) – 3:35
"Because of You" (Malo, Alan Miller, Hanna, Trevino) – 3:33
"The Air That I Breathe" (Albert Hammond, Mike Hazlewood) – 4:01

Personnel

The Mavericks
Paul Deakin- drums
Raul Malo- acoustic guitar, electric guitar, melodica, lead vocals
Eddie "Scarlito" Perez- electric guitar, background vocals
Robert Reynolds- bass guitar, background vocals

Additional musicians
Jimmy Bowland- alto saxophone
Glen Caruba- percussion
Eric Darken- percussion 
David Davidson- concert master
Chris Dunn- trombone
Kenny Greenberg- electric guitar
Jannelle Guillot- speaking part
Don Hart- string arrangements 
John Hobbs- keyboards
Jim Hoke- horn arrangements, tenor saxophone
Bill Huber- trombone
Love Sponge Orchestra- strings
Doug Moffet- baritone saxophone
Gordon Mote- keyboards, mellotron
Willie Nelson- vocals on "Time Goes By"
Matt Nygren- horn arrangements, trumpet
Frolian Sossa- background vocals
Debbie Spring- fiddle
Jim Williamson- trumpet 
Glenn Worf- upright bass

Chart performance

References

2003 albums
EMI Records albums
Sanctuary Records albums
The Mavericks albums
Albums produced by Kenny Greenberg